The Tulip Sho Japanese チューリップ賞} is a Japanese Grade 2 flat horse race in Japan for three-year-old Thoroughbred fillies run over a distance of 1,600 metres at Hanshin Racecourse, Takarazuka, Hyogo. The race is run in March and serves as a major trial race for the Oka Sho.

The Tulip Sho was first run in 1986. It became a Grade 3 race in 1994 and was elevated to Grade 2 status in 2018. Among the winners of the race have been Air Groove, Sweep Tosho, Vodka, Buena Vista, Harp Star and Sinhalite.

Winners since 2000

Earlier winners

 1986 - Reiho Tholon
 1987 - Max Beauty
 1988 - Shiyono Roman
 1989 - Youngest City
 1990 - Agnes Flora
 1991 - Sister Tosho
 1992 - Adorable
 1993 - Vega
 1994 - Agnes Parade
 1995 - Yuki Vivace
 1996 - Air Groove
 1997 - Orange Peel
 1998 - Dantsu Sirius
 1999 - Eishin Ruden

See also
 Horse racing in Japan
 List of Japanese flat horse races

References

Turf races in Japan